B84 may refer to :
 B84 (New York City bus) in Brooklyn
 Bundesstraße 84, a German road
 Faakersee Straße, an Austrian road
 Sicilian Defence, Scheveningen Variation, Encyclopaedia of Chess Openings code